The 2016 United States House of Representatives elections in Florida were held on Tuesday, November 8, 2016 to elect the 27 U.S. representatives from the state of Florida, one from each of the state's 27 congressional districts. The elections coincided with the elections of other federal and state offices, including President of the United States. 

A lawsuit challenging the districts under Florida's Congressional District Boundaries Amendment (Fair Districts Amendment) was filed in 2012 and was resolved in 2015. The results of the lawsuit had major repercussions on the congressional races in Florida in 2016. The primaries were held on August 30.

Redistricting lawsuit

In 2014, Circuit Court Judge Terry Lewis threw out the congressional map for violating Florida's 2010 Amendment 6 to the state Constitution, commonly called the Fair Districts Amendment.

District 1

Republican primary
Republican Jeff Miller has represented the district since being elected in 2001. Miller considered running for the U.S. Senate. On July 30, 2015, Miller decided not to run for the open Senate seat and announced he would run for reelection. In March 2016, Miller announced he would not run for reelection.

State Senator Greg Evers had expressed his interest in running for this seat if Miller had run for the Senate. In the August 30 primary, Matt Gaetz defeated Rebekah Johansen Bydlak, Cris Dosev, Greg Evers, Gary Fairchild, Brian Frazier, Mark Wichern, and James Zumwalt for the nomination.

Endorsements

Polling

Results

Democratic primary

Candidate
 Steven Specht, law student and former air force intelligence officer ran unopposed on primary day.

General election

Results

District 2
Redistricting significantly altered the 2nd, mainly by shifting most of Tallahassee's African American residents to the 5th District. On paper, this made the 2nd heavily Republican. Democrat Gwen Graham represented the district for one term after being elected in 2014, when she beat Republican incumbent Steve Southerland. She did not run for re-election.

Democratic primary
Steve Crapps filed to run as a Democrat in the primary as did former Deputy Attorney General Walter Dartland.

The primary results were too close to call as of September 1, 2016.

Results

Republican primary

Candidates
Declared
 Neal Dunn, urologist
 Ken Sukhia, former United States Attorney for the Northern District of Florida
 Mary Thomas, general counsel for the Florida Department of Elder Affairs

Dunn won the primary on August 30, 2016.

Endorsements

Results

Libertarian primary

Candidates
Declared
 Rob Lapham, retired IT executive

General election

Results

District 3
Republican Ted Yoho has represented the district since being elected in 2012, and ran unopposed. Businessman Kenneth McGurn also ran unopposed for the Democratic nomination.

General election

Results

District 4
Republican Ander Crenshaw has represented the district since being elected in 2000. On April 14, 2016, he announced that he will not run for re-election.

Republican primary

Candidates
Declared
 Stephen Kaufman, public relations manager
 Lake Ray, state representative
 Ed Malin
 Bill McClure, St. John's County commissioner
 Deborah Katz Pueschel, perennial candidate
 John Rutherford, former sheriff of Jacksonville
 Hans Tanzler III, former US assistant attorney, attorney, farmer, and son of former mayor of Jacksonville Hans Tanzler

John Rutherford won the primary on August 30, 2016.

Polling

Results

Democratic primary
Former Jacksonville City Councilman and former state representative Eric Smith announced that he would run for the Democratic nomination. On June 22, 2016, Smith announced that he was withdrawing from the race, leaving no Democratic candidates two days before the close of filing.

Dave Bruderly, an environmental engineer who was the nominee for Florida's 6th congressional district in 2004 and 2006, qualified on the last day of filing, and thus ran unopposed.

General election

Results

District 5

Democratic primary
Democrat Corrine Brown has represented the district and its various permutations since 1993. The court-ordered redistricting significantly altered her district. She had previously represented a district stretching from Jacksonville to Orlando. The new map pushed the 5th well to the north and west, and made it a more compact district stretching from Tallahassee to Jacksonville.

In July 2016, Brown and her chief of staff were indicted on charges of fraud. In the Democratic primary—the real contest in this district—she was defeated by former state senator Al Lawson of Tallahassee.

Polling

Results

Republican primary
Gloreatha "Glo" Scurry-Smith ran unopposed on primary day, August 30, 2016.

General election

Results

District 6
Republican Ron DeSantis has represented the district since being elected in 2012. DeSantis ran for the U.S. Senate, initially creating an open seat, though, on June 22, 2016, he withdrew from the Senate race to run for re-election to the House.

Republican primary

Candidates
Declared
 Ron DeSantis, incumbent U.S. Representative
 Fred Costello, state representative
 G.G. Galloway, real estate broker

Withdrawn
 Sandy Adams, former U.S. Representative
 Malcolm Anthony, attorney
 Adam Barringer, former mayor of New Smyrna Beach
 James Jusick, gun-parts manufacturer and retired police officer
 Ric Keller, former U.S. Representative
 Pat Mooney, direct-mail consultant and brother of Congressman Alex Mooney
 Brandon Patty, political consultant
 David Santiago, state representative (running for re-election)

Declined
 Dorothy Hukill, state senator
 Travis Hutson, state senator
 Mark Miner, former St. Johns County Commissioner
 Doc Renuart, former state representative
 John Rutherford, Duval County Sheriff

Endorsements

Results

Democratic primary

Candidates
Declared
 Jay McGovern, US Navy veteran
 Bill McCullough, businessman
 George Pappas, attorney
 Dwayne Taylor, state representative

Results

General election

Results

District 7

Republican primary
Republican John Mica has represented the 7th District since 1992. However, since the Florida Supreme Court's 2015 redistricting decision, Florida's 7th District now includes all of Seminole County and northern Orange County, including downtown Orlando, Winter Park, and the main campus of the University of Central Florida. In 2012, when Mica ran for re-election, he won with 59% of the vote, his smallest margin of victory in twenty years. Mica ran for re-election and wound up unopposed in the primary election after John Morning ended his campaign in November 2015.

Results

Democratic primary
Stephanie Murphy, a businesswoman, professor and former U.S. Defense Department national security specialist, ran unopposed for the Democratic nomination.

Endorsement

General election

Results

District 8

Republican primary
Republican Bill Posey has represented the district since being elected in 2012. He previously represented the 15th district from 2009 to 2013, prior to the decennial redistricting. He ran for re-election.

Democratic primary
Corry Westbrook, former legislative director of the National Wildlife Federation, ran unopposed for the Democratic nomination.

General election

Results

District 9
Democrat Alan Grayson has represented the district since being elected in 2012. He previously represented the 8th district from 2009 to 2011, prior to the decennial redistricting. On July 9, 2015, Grayson announced he would run for U.S. Senate in 2016 rather than seek re-election. Grayson lost the Democratic primary for the U.S. Senate seat to 18th congressional district Representative Patrick Murphy, who defeated Grayson and was declared the winner on August 30, 2016.

Democratic primary
Darren Soto was declared the winner of the Democratic primary for the 9th District on August 30, 2016, defeating Valleri Crabtree, Dena Minning Grayson and Susannah Randolph.

Endorsements

Polling

Results

Republican primary

Candidates
Declared
 Wayne Liebnitzky, engineer
 Wanda Rentas, vice mayor of Kissimmee

Declined
 Mike La Rosa, state representative

Results

General election

Results

District 10
Republican Daniel Webster has represented the district since being elected in 2012. He previously represented the 8th district from 2011 to 2013, prior to the decennial redistricting. However, after redistricting made the 10th substantially more Democratic, Webster opted to run in the neighboring 11th District, which included a slice of his former territory.

Republican primary

Candidates
Geoff LaGarde withdrew his name from the race on June 24, and endorsed Thuy Lowe for the nomination. Lowe was declared the nominee, and no Republican primary was held.

Democratic primary
Val Demings, former Orlando Police Chief and nominee for the 10th congressional district in 2012, was declared the winner of the Democratic primary for the 10th District on August 30, 2016.

Candidates
Declared
 Val Demings, former Orlando Police Chief and nominee in 2012
 Fatima Fahmy, attorney
 Bob Poe, former chair of the Florida Democratic Party
 Geraldine Thompson, state senator

Results

General election

Results

District 11
Republican Rich Nugent represented the district since being elected in 2011 (it was numbered as the 5th district from 2011 to 2013, prior to the decennial redistricting). He is not seeking re-election.

Republican primary
On the Republican side, Nugent's former chief-of-staff Justin Grabelle ran. 10th District congressman Daniel Webster ran against Grabelle in the Republican primary for the 11th; Webster was declared the primary winner on August 30, 2016.

Results

Democratic primary
Businessman Dave Koller, who was the Democratic nominee in 2014, ran unopposed in the 2016 primary.

General election

Results

District 12
Republican Gus Bilirakis has represented the district since being elected in 2012. He previously represented the 9th district from 2007 to 2013, prior to the decennial redistricting.

Attorney Robert Tager ran unopposed for the Democratic nomination.

General election

Results

District 13
Republican David Jolly has represented the district since being elected in a special election in 2014. Jolly ran for the U.S. Senate, initially creating an open seat, though, on June 17, 2016, he withdrew from the Senate race to run for re-election to the House, citing "unfinished business."

Republican primary

Candidates
Declared
 Mark Bircher, commercial pilot, retired United States Marine Corps Brigadier General, candidate for the seat in the 2014 special election
 David Jolly, incumbent U.S. Representative

Declined
 Rick Baker, former mayor of St. Petersburg
 Jeff Brandes, state senator (running for re-election)
 George Cretekos, Mayor of Clearwater
 Bob Gualtieri, Pinellas County Sheriff (running for re-election)
 Frank Hibbard, former mayor of Clearwater
 Jack Latvala, state senator
 Susan Latvala, former Pinellas County Commissioner
 Ash Mason, former staffer to Sen. Marco Rubio
Kathleen Peters, state representative and candidate for the seat in 2014
 Karen Seel, Pinellas County Commissioner (running for re-election)

Results

Democratic primary

Candidates
Declared
Charlie Crist, former Republican-turned-independent Governor of Florida, independent candidate for U.S. Senate in 2010, and Democratic nominee for governor in 2014

Withdrew
Eric Lynn, political consultant and former White House Middle East policy adviser and Pentagon official (running for state house)

Declined
Dwight Dudley, state representative
Rick Kriseman, Mayor of St. Petersburg
Mary Mulhern, former Tampa city councilwoman
Darden Rice, St. Petersburg city councilwoman

Endorsements

General election

Polling

Results

District 14
Democrat Kathy Castor has represented the district since being elected in 2012. She previously represented the 11th district from 2007 to 2013, prior to the decennial redistricting. Businesswoman Christine Quinn is challenging Castor as a Republican.

General election

Results

District 15
Republican Dennis A. Ross has represented the district since being elected in 2012. He previously represented the 12th district from 2011 to 2013, prior to the decennial redistricting. Jim Lange is challenging Ross as a Democrat.

General election

Results

District 16
Republican Vern Buchanan has represented the district since being elected in 2012. He previously represented the 16th district from 2009 to 2013, prior to the decennial redistricting. Buchanan ran for re-election.  Buchanan had previously considered running for the U.S. Senate instead.

Attorney Jan Schneider and airline pilot Brent King are running for the Democratic nomination.

Democratic primary

Candidates
 Jan Schneider
 Brent King

Results

Republican primary

Results

General election

Results

District 17
Republican Tom Rooney has represented the district since being elected in 2012. He previously represented the 13th district from 2007 to 2013, prior to the decennial redistricting. Rooney considered running for the U.S. Senate, but decided to run for re-election instead.

Businesswoman April Freeman ran unopposed for the Democratic nomination.

General election

Results

District 18
Democrat Patrick Murphy had represented the district since being elected in 2012. On March 23, 2015, he announced that he would run for U.S. Senate rather than reelection, creating an open seat. Murphy defeated Alan Grayson in the primary on August 30, 2016, and faced Marco Rubio in the November general election. Rubio defeated Murphy. Republican Brian Mast, a former U.S. Army bomb technician and Democrat Randy Perkins, founder and CEO of Ashbritt won their parties' respective primary elections on August 30, 2016. Mast defeated Perkins in the general election.

Democratic primary

Results

Republican primary

Polling

Results

General election

Polling

Results

District 19
Republican Curt Clawson has represented the district since being elected in a special election in 2014.  Clawson was mentioned as a potential candidate for the U.S. Senate in 2016. In May 2016, Clawson announced he would not seek a second term.

Republican primary

Candidates
Republicans running for their party's nomination include Sanibel councilman Chauncey Goss, businessman and former U.S. ambassador to the Vatican Francis Rooney and former Secret Service agent Dan Bongino.

Potential candidates included Republicans Paige Kreegel, Fort Myers Councilman Tom Leonardo, and former state representative Tom Grady, as well as Democratic businesswoman April Freeman, who was the party's nominee in 2014 for both the special election and in November.

Endorsements

Polling

Results

Democratic primary
Robert Neeld ran unopposed for the Democratic nomination.

General election

Results

District 20
Democrat Alcee Hastings has represented the district since being elected in 2012. He previously represented the 23rd district from 1993 to 2013, prior to the decennial redistricting. Hastings announced in November 2014 that he would run for re-election in 2016.

General election

Results

District 21
Democrat Ted Deutch has represented the district since being elected in 2012. He previously represented the 19th district from 2010 to 2013, prior to the decennial redistricting.

Deutch considered running for the U.S. Senate, but decided to run for re-election instead.  If Deutch had run for Senate, State Senator Joseph Abruzzo was interested in running for this seat.

As a result of 2015's statewide redistricting, incumbent Deutch effectively swapped seats with Lois Frankel, the current incumbent of the 22nd District. Deutch will seek election to the 22nd District seat while Frankel seeks election to District 21.

General election

Results

District 22
Democrat Lois Frankel has represented the district since being elected in 2012.

Boca Raton businessman Joseph Bensmihen is challenging Frankel as a Republican.  Physician Marc Freeman had also filed to run as a Republican, but switched to run in the 18th district.

As a result of 2015's statewide redistricting, incumbent Frankel will effectively be swapping seats with Ted Deutch, the current incumbent of the 21st District. Frankel will seek election to the 21st District seat while Deutch seeks election to District 22.

General election

Results

District 23
Democrat Debbie Wasserman Schultz has represented the district since being elected in 2012. She previously represented the 20th district from 2005 to 2013, prior to the decennial redistricting.

Democratic primary

Candidates
Declared
 Debbie Wasserman Schultz, incumbent
 Tim Canova, attorney and professor at Nova Southeastern University

Declined
 Martin Karp, Miami-Dade School Board member

Endorsements

Polling

Results

Republican primary

Candidates
 Marty Feigenbaum, attorney and Public Arbitrator for the Financial Industry Regulatory Authority
 Joe Kaufman, 2014 Republican nominee

Results

General election

Results

District 24

Democratic primary
Democrat Frederica Wilson has represented the district since being elected in 2012. She previously represented the 17th district from 2011 to 2013, prior to the decennial redistricting.

Retired NFL player and former U.S. Homeland Security agent Randal Hill challenged Wilson for the Democratic nomination.

Results

General election

Results
Democrat Frederica Wilson was unopposed in the general election.

District 25
Republican Mario Díaz-Balart has represented the district since 2012. He previously represented the 21st district from 2011 to 2013, as well as a different version of the 25th from 2003 to 2011, prior to the decennial redistricting. The Democratic candidate is Dr. Alina Valdes; neither candidate will face a primary opponent.

General election

Results

District 26
Republican Carlos Curbelo has represented the district since being elected in 2014.

Democratic primary
Annette Taddeo, nominee for Florida's 18th congressional district in 2008 and nominee for Lieutenant Governor of Florida in 2014, is set to challenge Curbelo as a Democrat. Former U.S. Representative Joe Garcia, however, is seeking a rematch against Curbelo.

Polling

Results

General election

Results

District 27

Republican primary
Republican Ileana Ros-Lehtinen represented the district since being elected in 2012. She previously represented the 18th district from 1989 to 2013, prior to the decennial redistricting.

Results

Democratic primary
US Army veteran Frank Perez, businessman Scott Fuhrman, and attorney Adam Sackrin are running for the Democratic nomination.

Results

General election

Results

See also
 2016 United States House of Representatives elections
 2016 United States elections

References

Florida
2016
United States House of Representatives